The year 2020 was the 28th year in the history of the Ultimate Fighting Championship (UFC), a mixed martial arts promotion based in the United States.

Partnership
Starting in 2021, a partnership between the UFC and Dapper Labs's Flow platform for MMA fans to own, maintain and trade UFC-branded collectibles was announced on February 26, 2020.

Onwards from April 2021, the UFC announced Venum as their exclusive outfitting partner on July 11, 2020.

2020 by the numbers 

The numbers below records the events, fights, techniques and fighters held or performed for the year of  2020 in UFC.

Releases and retirements
These fighters have either been released from their UFC contracts, announced their retirement or joined other promotions:

Alex White - Released in February - Featherweight 
Anderson Silva - Released in November - Middleweight
Anthony Pettis - Sign with PFL in December - Welterweight 
Antônio Rogério Nogueira - Retired in July - Light Heavyweight
Austin Springer - Released in September - Featherweight
Ben Saunders - Released in January - Welterweight
Ben Sosoli - Released in October - Heavyweight
Bevon Lewis-  Released in November - Middleweight
Brad Katona - Released in February - Bantamweight
Brandon Davis - Released in January - Featherweight
Brett Johns - Signed with Bellator MMA in October - Bantamweight 
Callan Potter - Released in August - Lightweight
Carlos Huachin - Released in January - Bantamweight
Chad Laprise - Released in March - Welterweight 
Charles Byrd - Retired in June - Middleweight
Cole Smith - Released in December - Bantamweight 
Corey Anderson - Signed with Bellator MMA in August - Light Heavyweight
Cyril Asker - Released in March - Heavyweight
Daniel Cormier - Retired in August - Heavyweight
Daniel Spitz - Released in January - Heavyweight
Daniel Teymur - Released in February - Featherweight 
Darko Stošić - Released in January - Light Heavyweight
Desmond Green - Released in January - Lightweight
Dong Hyun Ma - Released in March - Lightweight
Duda Santana - Released in September - Women's Bantamweight
Erik Koch - Released in December - Welterweight 
Enrique Barzola - End of Contract in October - Bantamweight
Evan Dunham - Released in August - Featherweight
Fabrício Werdum - Chose not resign in July - Heavyweight
Gadzhimurad Antigulov - Released in December - Light Heavyweight 
Gina Mazany - Released in January - Women's Bantamweight
Grigory Popov - Released in January - Bantamweight
Hector Aldana - Released in January - Welterweight
Henry Cejudo - Retired in May - Bantamweight
Isabella de Pádua - Released in March - Women's Flyweight
Ismail Naurdiev - Choose not to resign in March - Welterweight
James Vick - Released in October - Welterweight
Jeff Hughes - Released in October - Heavyweight 
Jin Soon Son - Released in January - Bantamweight
Jessin Ayari - Released in December - Lightweight
Jodie Esquibel - Released in March - Women's Strawweight
John Dodson - Released in September - Bantamweight
John Gunther - Released in July - Middleweight
John Phillips -  Released in November - Middleweight
Jordan Mein - Signed with Bellator MMA in January - Welterweight
Juan Adams - Released in January - Heavyweight
Júnior Albini - Released in January - Heavyweight
Jussier Formiga - Released in November - Flyweight
Justin Ledet -  Released in November - Light Heavyweight
Kalindra Faria - Released in February - Women's Flyweight
Khabib Nurmagomedov - Retired in October - Lightweight
Khadis Ibragimov - Released in October - Light Heavyweight
Khalid Murtazaliev - Released in March - Middleweight
Klidson Abreu - Released in August - Light Heavyweight 
Kyle Bochniak - Released in January - Featherweight
Kyle Prepolec - Released in March - Lightweight
Lucie Pudilová - Released in January - Women's Bantamweight
Luiz Eduardo Garagorri - Released in December - Featherweight 
Luke Jumeau - Released in January - Welterweight
Iuri Alcântara - Released in October - Bantamweight
Mara Romero Borella - Released in October - Women's Flyweight 
Marcos Rosa Mariano - Released in March - Lightweight
Martin Bravo - Released in January - Featherweight
Mark De La Rosa - Released in December - Bantamweight 
Matt Wiman - Released in December - Lightweight 
Matthew Lopez - Released in March - Bantamweight
Max Rohskopf -  Released in August - Lightweight
Nad Narimani - Released in August - Featherweight
Nathan Coy - Released in February - Welterweight
Nordine Taleb - Signed with ARES FC in January - Welterweight
Oskar Piechota - Released in June - Middleweight
Paige VanZant - Signed with Bare Knuckle Fighting Championship in August - Women's Flyweight
Peter Sobotta - Retired in July - Welterweight
Polo Reyes - Released in January - Featherweight
Ray Borg - Released in August - Bantamweight
Rachael Ostovich - Released in December - Women's Flyweight
Ricardo Lamas - Retired in September - Featherweight
Roman Bogatov - Released in August - Lightweight
Rustam Khabilov - Signed with  Bellator MMA in October - Welterweight
Salim Touahri - Released in January - Welterweight
Saparbek Safarov - Released in December - Middleweight 
Siyar Bahadurzada - Retired in June - Welterweight 
Stevie Ray - Retired in September - Lightweight
Talita Bernardo - Released in March - Women's Bantamweight
Teemu Packalén - Choose not to resign in March - Lightweight 
Thiago Alves - Released in January - Welterweight
Todd Duffee - Retired in September - Heavyweight  
Tonya Evinger - Released in March - Women's Bantamweight
Trevor Smith - Released in March - Middleweight 
Wuliji Buren - Released in January - Bantamweight
Yoel Romero - Released in December - Middleweight
Zelim Imadaev - Released in October - Welterweight

Debut UFC fighters
The following fighters fought their first UFC fight in 2020:

Aalon Cruz - UFC Fight Night 169
Adrian Yanez - UFC Fight Night 181
Alan Baudot - UFC Fight Night 173 
Aleksa Camur - UFC 246
Alexander Muñoz - UFC Fight Night 174
Alexander Romanov - UFC Fight Night 177
Ali Alqaisi - UFC Fight Night 174
Amir Albazi - UFC Fight Night 172
Andreas Michailidis - UFC on ESPN 13
Anthony Ivy - UFC on ESPN 10
Austin Lingo - UFC 247
Austin Springer - UFC Fight Night 175
Bill Algeo - UFC Fight Night 175
Brandon Royval - UFC on ESPN 9
Brok Weaver - UFC Fight Night 167
Cameron Else - UFC on ESPN 16
Carlos Felipe - UFC Fight Night 172
Carlton Minus - UFC on ESPN 15
Charlie Ontiveros - UFC Fight Night 181
Chris Daukaus - UFC 252
Christian Aguilera - UFC on ESPN 10
Cody Durden - UFC Fight Night 173
Cory McKenna - UFC Fight Night 183
Danny Chavez - UFC 252
Danilo Marques - UFC 253
Daniel Rodriguez - UFC Fight Night 167
Darrick Minner - UFC Fight Night 169
David Dvořák - UFC Fight Night 170
Dricus du Plessis - UFC Fight Night 173
Duško Todorović - UFC on ESPN 16
Dustin Stoltzfus - UFC 255
Gabriel Green - UFC on ESPN 10
Guram Kutateladze - UFC Fight Night 180
Gustavo Lopez - UFC on ESPN 10
Herbert Burns - UFC Fight Night 166
Isaac Villanueva - UFC Fight Night 171
Ilia Topuria - UFC Fight Night 173
Impa Kasanganay - UFC Fight Night 175
Irwin Rivera - UFC on ESPN 8
Jacob Malkoun - UFC 254
Jai Herbert - UFC on ESPN 14
Jamahal Hill - UFC Fight Night 166
Jamall Emmers - UFC 248
Jamie Pickett - UFC Fight Night 183
Jamey Simmons - UFC Fight Night 182
Jared Gooden - UFC 255
Jason Witt - UFC on ESPN 12
Jerome Rivera - UFC Fight Night 178
Jimmy Flick - UFC Fight Night 183
Jinh Yu Frey - UFC on ESPN 12
Jiří Procházka - UFC 251
Joaquin Buckley - UFC Fight Night 174
John Castañeda - UFC on ESPN 14
Johnny Muñoz Jr. - UFC Fight Night 174
Jordan Leavitt - UFC on ESPN 19
Jordan Williams - UFC on ESPN 16
Jordan Wright - UFC on ESPN 15
Josh Parisian - UFC on ESPN 18
Joshua Culibao - UFC Fight Night 168
Justin Jaynes - UFC on ESPN 11
KB Bhullar - UFC Fight Night 173 
Kai Kamaka III - UFC 252
Khaos Williams - UFC 247
Kanako Murata - UFC Fight Night 183
Kay Hansen - UFC on ESPN 12
Kevin Croom - UFC Fight Night 177
Kevin Natividad - UFC Fight Night 181
Khamzat Chimaev - UFC on ESPN 13
Kyle Daukaus - UFC on ESPN 12
Kyler Phillips - UFC Fight Night 169
Liliya Shakirova - UFC 254
Louis Cosce - UFC 255
Ľudovít Klein - UFC 253
Nassourdine Imavov - UFC on ESPN 16
Nate Landwehr - UFC Fight Night 166
Nate Maness - UFC Fight Night 173
Malcolm Gordon - UFC Fight Night 172
Mariya Agapova - UFC on ESPN 10
Mark Striegl - UFC Fight Night 180
Mateusz Gamrot - UFC Fight Night 180
Matthew Semelsberger - UFC on ESPN 15
Max Rohskopf -  UFC on ESPN 11
Maxim Grishin - UFC 251	
Miranda Maverick - UFC 254
Modestas Bukauskas - UFC on ESPN 13
Mounir Lazzez - UFC on ESPN 13
Niklas Stolze - UFC on ESPN 14
Norma Dumont - UFC Fight Night 169
Ode' Osbourne - UFC 246
Parker Porter - UFC 252
Peter Barrett - UFC Fight Night 174
Phil Hawes - UFC 254
Philipe Lins - UFC Fight Night 171
Rhys McKee - UFC on ESPN 14
Rodrigo Nascimento - UFC on ESPN 8
Roman Bogatov - UFC 251
Roman Dolidze - UFC Fight Night 172
Sam Hughes - UFC 256
Sarah Alpar - UFC Fight Night 178
Shanna Young - UFC Fight Night 167
Sasha Palatnikov - UFC 255
Shavkat Rakhmonov - UFC 254
Spike Carlyle - UFC Fight Night 169
Stephanie Egger - UFC Fight Night 173
Steve Garcia - UFC Fight Night 169
Ramiz Brahimaj - UFC Fight Night 182
Ray Rodriguez - UFC Fight Night 176
Roque Martinez - UFC Fight Night 177
Timur Valiev - UFC on ESPN 15
T.J. Brown - UFC Fight Night 169
T.J. Laramie - UFC Fight Night 178
Tafon Nchukwi - UFC Fight Night 183
Tagir Ulanbekov - UFC Fight Night 173
Tom Aspinall - UFC on ESPN 14
Tony Gravely - UFC Fight Night 166
Tony Kelley - UFC 252
Trevin Jones - UFC on ESPN 15
Victor Rodriguez - UFC Fight Night 181
Vincent Cachero - UFC Fight Night 173
William Knight - UFC 253
Youssef Zalal - UFC 247
Zarrukh Adashev - UFC on ESPN 10
Zhalgas Zhumagulov - UFC 251

Suspended fighters
The list below is based on fighters suspended either by (1) United States Anti-Doping Agency (USADA) or World Anti-Doping Agency (WADA) for violation of taking prohibited substances or non-analytical incidents, (2) by local commissions on misconduct during the fights or at event venues, or (3) by the UFC for reasons also stated below.

Title fights

Events list

See also
 List of UFC champions
 List of UFC events
 List of current UFC fighters

References

External links
 UFC past events on UFC.com
 UFC events results at Sherdog.com

Ultimate Fighting Championship by year
2020 in mixed martial arts